Barnet began the season with a new manager after Lawrie Sanchez was sacked towards the end of the 2011/12 season and subsequent caretaker manager Martin Allen was not asked to continue. The new manager was Mark Robson, who was appointed on 10 June 2012. However, after failing to win any of his first 13 games, Edgar Davids was brought in to partner Robson as well as taking up playing duties. Robson departed the club on 28 December 2012, leaving Davids in sole charge. Barnet were relegated on the last day of the season, finishing 23rd with 51 points.

League table

Results

Pre-season friendlies

League Two

FA Cup

League Cup

Football League Trophy

Herts Senior Cup

Squad statistics

Appearances and goals

Top scorers

Transfers

Players Transferred In

Players Transferred Out

Players Loaned In

Players Loaned Out

References

Barnet F.C.
Barnet F.C. seasons